Peace Orchestra: Reset is a remix album of the Peace Orchestra, featuring remixes by artists such as Gotan Project and Trüby Trio, released by Studio !K7 in 2002.

Track listing 

 "The Man (Gotan Project El hombre de la pampa Mix)"  – 7:17
 "Meister Petz (Beanfield Remix)" – 6:35
 "Double Drums (DJ DSL Remix)" – 5:29
 "Domination (Raw Deal Remix)" – 6:53
 "Marakesch (Meitz Remix)" – 6:29
 "Henry (Zero db Remix)" – 7:45
 "Domination (Guillaume Boulard Remix)" – 5:26
 "Who Am I (Château Flight Remix)" – 4:50
 "Henry (Soulpatrol Remix)" – 6:36
 "Shining (Trüby Trio Treatment)" – 6:47
 "The Man (Kosma Deep Gratitude Interpretation)" – 9:24

References

Peace Orchestra albums
2002 remix albums